West Silchar College, established in 1985, is a general degree college situated at Barjatrapur, in Cachar district, Assam. This college is affiliated with the Assam University.

Departments

Science
Mathematics

Arts
Arabic
Bengali
English
Manipuri
Sanskrit
History
Economics
Sociology
Political Science

References

External links

Universities and colleges in Assam
Colleges affiliated to Assam University
Educational institutions established in 1985
1985 establishments in Assam